Tŏkch'ŏn is a si, or city, in northern South P'yŏngan province, North Korea. It is bordered by Nyŏngwŏn and Maengsan to the east, Kujang county in North P'yŏngan province to the north, Kaech'ŏn to the west and Pukch'ang to the south. It was known as Tokugawa during Japanese rule.

History

On April 28, 2017, a Hwasong-12 intermediate-range ballistic missile launched from near Pukchang Airport reportedly crashed into Ch'ŏngsin-dong, Tokchon, damaging several structures in the city.

Administrative divisions
Tŏkch'ŏn-si is divided into 22 tong (neighbourhoods) and 10 ri (villages):

Economy
The Sŭngri Motor Plant (with associated workshops) has been one of the few domestic sources of both low-cost replicas of foreign passenger cars and military-service trucks in North Korea since it was established in 1950, and developed through the massive militarization campaigns of Kim Il-sung in the 1970s and 80s.

However, the total depletion of foreign credit by the end of the 1980s caused the manufacturing industry to implode; the supply of steel for metalworking at Sŭngri slowed to a trickle, and even when available, the production lines had regular power outages. The severe famine in the countryside had also caused an exodus of starving peasants to the cities, further straining food supplies and worker productivity. 20,000 cars and trucks were made in Tŏkch'ŏn in 1980, by 1996 the number was just 150, all of which were Army trucks, some later modified as rocket artillery launchers.

Transportation
Tŏkch'ŏn-si is served by the Korean State Railway's P'yŏngdŏk line and five branchlines.

See also 

 List of secondary subdivisions of North Korea
 Geography of North Korea
 South Pyongan

Further reading

Dormels, Rainer. North Korea's Cities: Industrial facilities, internal structures and typification. Jimoondang, 2014.

References

External links 
 
City profile of Tokchon 

 
Cities in South Pyongan